Belcodène is a commune situated east of Marseille in the department of Bouches-du-Rhône in the Provence-Alpes-Côte d'Azur region in southern France. There is a beautiful cohabitation between the horses and the humans.  A peaceful and quiet agreement between the two parts can be observed.

Population
Its inhabitants are called Belcodénois in French.

See also
Communes of the Bouches-du-Rhône department

References

External links
   Official town website

Communes of Bouches-du-Rhône
Bouches-du-Rhône communes articles needing translation from French Wikipedia